The As-Sunna Mosque or Assounna Mosque (among other similar spellings) is a large mosque in central Rabat, Morocco. It is one of the largest mosques in Morocco.

History 
The mosque was founded by the Alaouite sultan Moulay Mohammed ben Abdallah (who briefly made Rabat his royal capital) and was completed in 1785. However, it was almost entirely restored in the 19th century. In 1969, on the occasion of King Hassan II's 40th birthday, the mosque was renovated again and its minaret was moved from its original position at the northwest corner of the mosque and reconstructed "stone by stone" at the mosque's southwest corner, where it stands today, in order to enhance its perspective along the axis of Avenue Mohammed V.

Architecture 
The mosque occupies a visually prominent position on Avenue Mohammed V, one of the main boulevards of downtown Rabat. Just west and south of it is the Royal Palace. The building has a nearly square floor plan measuring roughly 74 meters per side with a surface area of 5565 metres, making it the fourth largest historic mosque in Morocco. It has a relatively standard layout for a Moroccan mosque, featuring a large rectangular courtyard (sahn) surrounded by galleries and a prayer hall consisting of three main transverse aisles running parallel to the qibla (southeastern) wall. At either end of the courtyard, aligned with the side entrances, are ornamental pavilions which recall a similar arrangement at the much older al-Qarawiyyin Mosque in Fes. The northern part of the mosque is occupied by additional rooms which once housed students. The minaret, featuring decorative motifs carved along its four facades, is located at the southwest corner but originally stood on its northwest corner. The mosque has multiple ornamental gateways and traditional Moroccan decoration inside.

See also
 List of mosques in Morocco

References

External links 

 Al-Sunna Mosque at Qantara-med.org (includes photos of the mosque's interior and exterior)
 Images of al-Sunna Mosque in Manar al-Athar digital photo archive

Mosques in Rabat
'Alawi architecture